Chui Chung-San (often known as Shu Zhong Xin, Hsu Zhong-Xin or Alan Hsu; 16 August 1952 – 2 November 2022) was a Hong Kong actor, director, choreographer, martial artist and stuntman. He was known for being an action director and stuntman. Chui was known for films such as The Rebellious Reign, Kung Fu Vs. Yoga, Two Fists Against the Law and 7 Grandmasters; as well as other various Taiwanese television shows.

Chui directed several wireless television series. He was critically acclaimed for choreographing and co-directing Ching Siu-tung's A Chinese Ghost Story.

Background
While attending school, he would often be expelled for fighting with other students. At the age of ten, he was sent to Peking Opera school for acrobatic and stunt training. Soon after finishing his studies at Peking Opera, he joined the Shaw Brothers to continue with his career as an action director.

Throughout his career he made over 130 films including those with various stunt work and acting roles. Chui was also known for partaking in and directing Taiwanese action movies.

Early career
In 1970, he became a stuntman for companies such as Golden Harvest and Shaw Brothers. As well as being an on-screen stuntman, he also worked on various TVB productions such as martial arts and Chinese historical dramas. He would also often appear as an extra role in films such as Hapkido, Enter the Dragon, and When Taekwondo Strikes. Alongside Sammo Hung, Jackie Chan, Ching Siu-tung and others, Chui worked on various other roles throughout the 1970s.

Chui also worked in various independent movie studios and as minor roles in several Shaw Brothers productions, mostly under Chor Yuen's direction and would frequently appear as a supporting actor or extra until 1978.

Success and later career
Later around 1979 and 1980, Chui became known for roles such as 7 Grandmasters (1978), Kung Fu Vs. Yoga (1979) and Two Fists Against the Law (1980), as well as being an action director for the first time in the movies such as Shaolin Ex Monk in 1978 and John Woo's Last Hurrah for Chivalry (1978).

Alan would also frequently be seen in Taiwanese productions through the later 1970s to early 1980s, such as Born Invincible (1978), Revenge of the Shaolin Master (1979), Zen Kwan Do Strikes Paris (1981), The Denouncement of Chu Liu Hsiang (1982), Dragon Lord (1983) and others.

Chui also helped his long-time friend Ching Siu-tung for the choreography for two films from 1986 to 1987. He first collaborated with Tung to choreograph the Witch from Nepal' starring Chow Yun-fat and Emily Chu. Along with the collaborations with Tung, Philip Kwok, and Lau Chi Ho, he shared the award for the best action choreography. The second collaboration with Tung was A Chinese Ghost Story in 1987, mainly supervising the wiring action sequence and the stunt double for the early Leslie Cheung. Along with the previous action choreographer crew members (Tung, Kwok, Ho and Bobby Wu), he was nominated for the best choreographer of 1987. Alan would later help Wilson Yip for the choreography for the same wiring stunt sequence technique on the 2011 remake of A Chinese Ghost Story.

Chui would also direct his own low-budget action movies such as Tough Beauty and the Sloppy Slop (1995) starring Yuen Biao and Cynthia Khan and Bloody Secret (2000) starring Anthony Wong and Ray Lui.

Throughout 2005 and 2011, Alan would reunite with the director Johnnie To (Who previously worked in two films starring Tony Leung Chiu-wai, The Royal Scoundrel (1991) and Tomorrow (1995)) and would work on some of the critically acclaimed films such as Breaking News, Election 2 and Life Without Principle. After the release of Life Without Principle in 2011, he took a break from film roles and began focusing on television series and wired stunts. He later returned to filmography in Once Upon a Time in Macau - The Way of the Tiger in 2016.

Chui was still working on various television shows in the years leading to his death. He played the role of a villain in the 2017 Hong Kong drama series Line Walker: The Prelude.

Personal life and death
Chui was married to his Taiwanese wife. He died on 2 November 2022, at the age of 70. Chui was survived by two children: Chui Ea-Luen (son) and Chui Yik-Mei (daughter).

Filmography

Filmography as an actor

 Come Drink with Me (1966) – One of the Little Kids
 The Rescue (1971) – extra
 Intimate Confessions of a Chinese Courtesan (1972) – extra
 The Casino (1972) – Gambler (extra)
 Hapkido (1972) – Hapkido Student
 The Young Avenger (1972) – Liu's Bandit
  (1972) – Shi's soldier fellow
 Duel of the Dragons (1973) – extra
 Tiger (1973) – Japanese (extra) 
 Iron Bull (1973) – extra
 The Awaken Punch – Thug (extra) 
 Fist of Unicorn (1973) – Street troupe
 Enter the Dragon (1973) – Guard (extra)
 When Taekwondo Strikes (1973) – Japanese who gets beaten 
 The Rendezvous of Warriors (1973) 
 The Rats (1973) – Pickpocket
 Chinese Hercules (1973) – extra
 Little Tiger of Canton (1973) – extra
 Angry Tiger (1973) 
 Ambush (1973) – extra
 The Tournament (1974) – Japanese student
 Superior Youngster (1974) – Thug 
 Naughty! Naughty! (1974) – Boss Feng's Thug
 The Man with the Golden Gun (1974) 
 The Young Dragons (1975) – extra
 Gambling Syndicate (1975) – Casino thug
 The Super Inframan (1975) – extra
 Cleopatra Jones and the Casino of Gold (1975) – thug
 The Golden Lion (1975) – extra
 Flatfoot in Hong Kong (1975) - Casino Police Informer (uncredited)
 Killer Clans (1976) – Chuan's Man
 The Web of Death (1976) – One of 3 Heroes of West Moon 
 The Magic Blade (1976) – Assassin Bum
 Bruce Lee and I (1976) – Thug at the bar 
 You Are Wonderful (1976) – Killer with knife
 Oily Maniac (1976) – extra
 The Girlie Bar (1976) – extra 
 Bruce Lee: The Man, The Myth (1976) – Bruce Lee's Student
 Brotherhood (1976) – Hsing's Gangster 
 Wrong Side of the Track (1976) – Rascal 
 Judgement of an Assassin (1977) 
 To Kill a Jaguar (1977) – extra
 Last Strike (1977) – Piao's Thug
 The Sentimental Swordsman (1977) – Hei She 
 The Adventures of Emperor Chien Lung (1977) – extra
 Death Duel (1977) – Yen's challenger at the woods
 The Instant Kung Fu Man (1977) – Mok Sai 
 Broken Oath (1977) – One of Qi's men 
 The Fatal Flying Guillotines (1977) – Hero with 3 section staff
 Mantis Fists and Tiger Claws of Shaolin (1977) – Thug (extra)
 Pursuit of Vengeance (1977) – Devil's Sword/Imposter/Assassin
 The Supernatural (1978) 
 Snake in the Eagle's Shadow, Part II (1978) – Tan Kwan Yung
 Shaolin Ex Monk (1978) – Chih Kung 
 7 Grandmasters (1978) – Ku Yi Fung 
 Born Invincible (1978) – Pa Chu (Senior)
 The Proud Youth (1978) – Four Friends from Plum Garden
 Clan of Amazons (1978) – Chongwei's Soldier
 Flying Guillotine, Part II (1978) – extra
 Swordsman and Enchantress (1978) – Black Inn's Thug
 Soul of the Sword (1978) – Pai Kwa Hall's Swordsman
 Legend of the Bat (1978) – Gentleman Sword 
 The 36th Chamber of Shaolin (1978) – Soldier
 Dragon of the Swordsman (1978) – Assassin with flying Guillotine 
 Dirty Tiger, Crazy Frog (1978) – gets pickpocketed at Casino 
 Game of Death (1978) – extra
 Revenge of the Pink Panther (1978) – extra 
 Golgo 13: Assignment Kowloon (1978) – Kuroi Ryu 
 Incredible Kung Fu Mission (1979) – Lo Tung 
 A Massacre Survivor (1979) – Ling's blade fighter
 Revenge of the Shaolin Master (1979) – Chiu Chun's Thug
 Last Hurrah for Chivalry (1979) – Oriental Fighter 
 The Challenger (1979) – The Spear Fighter 
 Kung Fu Vs. Yoga (1979) – Wu Shing 
 Two Fists Against the Law (1980) – Fang Er 
 Devil Killer (1980) – Liu Da Long 
 War of the Shaolin Temple (1980) 
 Shaolin Temple Against Lama (1980) – Cha Hsiu 
 The Rebellious Reign (1980) – Pak Tai Hau 
 The Loot (1980) – Thief Black Wolf 
 Daggers 8 (1980) – Wang Chen Pang 
 Black Eagle's Blades (1981) 
 Zen Kwun Do Strikes in Paris (1981) – Ken Shiu (Liu's Friend)
 Kung Fu from Beyond the Grave (1982) – Fang Zheng 
 Night Orchid (1982)
 Miraculous Sword Art (1982)
 Dragon Lord (1983) – Lu Chen's Gang Member
 Swordsman Adventure (1983)
 Angry Young Man (1983) – Liu Ping 
 The Denouncement of Chu Liu Hsiang (1983)
 Shaolin Vs. Ninja (1983)
 Demon Strike (1984) – Fan Kuei 
 Five Fighters from Shaolin (1984) – Kum Dat Jin 
 The Innocent Interloper (1986) – Opera Performer (Cameo)
 The Good Buddies (1987) – Japanese Fighter
 Manchester Death Warrant (1990)
 The Fun, the Luck and the Tycoon (1990) – Robber (Uncredited)
 The Killer's Blues (1990) – Suet's Father Killed by Ming
 The Killer (1990) – title char (cameo)
 The Story of My Son (1990) – Policeman with debt 
 The Monks From Shaolin (1991) 
 The Fatal Game (1991) – Hu Xiongdi 
 The Fatal Mission (1991) 
 Royal Scoundrel (1991) – Lo To Keung 
 Running on Empty (1991)
 The Queen of Gamble (1991) – Kitaro 
 The Little Shaolin Monk (1992) 
 Direct Line (1992) – Lai Jun Tao 
 Girls Without Tomorrow (1992) – Brother Er 
 Powerful Four (1992) – Suspect in Teahouse
 Angel Terminators (1992)
 Bogus Cops (1993) – Man bragging at bar
 The Secret File (1993)
 The Wild Girls (1993)
 Last Hero in China (1993) – Lui Yat Siu 
 Beyond the Copline (1993)
 S. D. U. Mission in Mission (1994) – Mao Ying 
 Tomorrow (1995)
 Fatal Assignment (1995)
 Drugs Fighters (1995) – Main villain 
 Tough Beauty and the Sloppy Slop (1995) – Peter Wu 
 Scarred Memory (1996) – Hu Shing
 Street of Fury (1996) – Kwong Yan Fai 
 Haunted Karaoke (1997) – Francis Chui 
 Return of Dragon (1998) – Japanese boss
 Gold Rush (1999) – Tsui Bill 
 No Sweat (2000) 
 Prostitute Killers (2000) – Brother Shark 
 Man Wanted 3 (2000) – Brother Wind
 Breaking News (2004) – Chun's Target 
 Election 2 (2006) – Uncle Tank 
 Hong Kong Bronx (2008) – Uncle Man
 I Corrupt All Cops (2009) – Limp
 Turning Point (2009) – Master Da 
 Vengeance (2009) – George Fung's Bodyguard
 Adventure of the King (2010) – Beggar 
 A Chinese Ghost Story (2011) – Prisoner
 Life Without Principle (2011) – Sung's thug 
 Punished (2011) – Yao's ex-triad boss
 Once Upon a Time in Macau - The Way of the Tiger (2016) 
 My Alien Girlfriend(2017)- Luo Bo Tu
 Kungfu Stuntmen (2020) - Himself 
 Quan Dao: The Journey of a Boxer (2020)

Filmography as an action director and assistant action director

 The Instant Kung Fu Man (1977) – (assistant action director) uncredited
 Shaolin Ex Monk (1978)
 Ways of Kung Fu (1978)
 Iron Fisted Eagle's Claw (1979)
 Last Hurrah for Chivalry (1979) - (assistant action director)
 Kung Fu Vs. Yoga (1979)
 The Incredible Kung Fu Mission (1979) – (co-choreographer) uncredited
 The Rebellious Reign (1980)
 Shaolin Temple Against Lama (1980)
 War of the Shaolin Temple (1980)
 Two Fists Against the Law (1980)
 Zen Kwan Do Strikes Paris (1981) – (Co-choreographer) uncredited
 Shaolin Temple Strikes Back (1981)
 Black Eagle's Blade (1981)
 Miraculous Sword Art (1982)
 Kung Fu from Beyond the Grave (1982)
 Crazy Horse, Intelligent Monkey (1982)
 Night Orchid (1982)
 Shaolin Vs. Ninja (1983)
 Demon Strike (1984)
 Witch from Nepal (1986) (Co-choreographer)
 A Chinese Ghost Story (1987) - (Co-choreographer)
 The Inspector Wears Skirts (1988)
 Midnight Angel (1990)
 Fatal Mission (1991)
 The Killer (1991)
 Direct Line (1992)
 The Inspector Wears Skirts IV (1992)
 Painted Skin (1992)
 Super Lady Cop (1992)
 The Thief of Time (1992)
 The Wild Girls (1993)
 Magic Sword (1993)
 Hero – Beyond the Boundary of Time (1993)
 Fatal Seduction (1993)
 The Trail (1993)
 Tough Beauty and the Sloppy Slop (1995)
 Drug Fighters (1995)
 Street of Fury (1996)
 Haunted Karaoke (1997)
 Leopard Hunting (1998)
 White Storm (2000)
 Man Wanted 3 (2000)
 Boxing Hero (2003)
 Internet Disaster (2003)
 A Chinese Ghost Story (2011 film) (2011)
 Nightmare (2011)

Filmography as director

 The Incredible Kung Fu Mission (1979) – (assistant director)
 Hero – Beyond the Boundary of Time (1993) - (assistant director)(uncredited)
 Tough Beauty and the Sloppy Slop (1995) - (co-director with Yuen Bun) 
 Bloody Secret (2000)

Television series

Drama
The Legend of the Condor Heroes (1983)
Invincible Swordsman (1984)
Genghis Khan (1987)
Zheng Cheng Gong (1987)
Wing Chun (1988)
The Justice of Life (1988)
The Hunter's Prey (1990)
The Witness of Time (1990)
On the Edge (1991)
The Commandments (1992)
Gik Dok Hung Leng (1992)
The Intangible Truth (1994)
The Criminal Investigator II (1996)
Once Upon a Time in Shanghai (1996)
Weapons of Power (1997)
War and Remembrance (1998)
A Smiling Ghost Story (1998)
Highs and Lows (2012)
Silver Spoon, Sterling Shackles (2012)
Friendly Fire (2012)
Highs and Lows (2012)
Silver Spoon, Sterling Shackle (2012)
Always and Ever (2013)
Brother's Keeper (2013)
ICAC Investigators 2014 (2014)
Young Charioteers (2015)
Youth Huo Yuan-Jia (2015)
K9 Cop (2016)
Come Home Love: Dinner at 8 (2016)
Recipes to Live By (2017)
Burning Hands (2017)
Line Walker: The Prelude (2017)
Heart and Greed (2017)

Variety shows
The Green Room (Issue 2013)
Hong Kong People Say (2015)
Sunday Stage Fight (2016)

References

External links
 
 http://www.hkcinemagic.com/en/people.asp?id=1444

1952 births
2022 deaths
Hong Kong male film actors
Hong Kong male television actors
20th-century Hong Kong male actors
Hong Kong stunt performers
21st-century Hong Kong male actors